Miloslav Výborný (born 1952) is a Czech politician of KDU-ČSL. He was a member of the Chamber of Deputies from 1990 to after the 2002 elections, serving as defense minister from 1996. He served as a justice on the Constitutional Court of the Czech Republic from 3. 6. 2003 to 3. 6. 2013. His son, Marek Výborný, was elected leader of KDU-ČSL in 2019.

References

KDU-ČSL MPs
1952 births
Living people
KDU-ČSL Government ministers
Defence ministers of the Czech Republic
Constitutional Court of the Czech Republic judges
People from Chrudim
Members of the Chamber of Deputies of the Czech Republic (1992–1996)
Members of the Chamber of Deputies of the Czech Republic (1996–1998)
Members of the Chamber of Deputies of the Czech Republic (1998–2002)
Members of the Chamber of Deputies of the Czech Republic (2002–2006)
Mayors of places in the Czech Republic
Charles University alumni
KDU-ČSL mayors